Noel Leung Siu-bing (born 29 December 1969 in Macau) is a Hong Kong actress known for her roles in TVB television. She was the second runner-up in Miss Hong Kong 1990.

Filmography

External links

20th-century Hong Kong actresses
21st-century Hong Kong actresses
TVB actors
1969 births
Living people
Macau emigrants to Hong Kong
Macau-born Hong Kong artists